KF Gramozi is an Albanian football club based in Ersekë in the Kolonjë District.

History
The club was founded in 1927 and competed in the lower divisions of Albanian football for much of its history. The club were crowned winners of the Albanian Second Division for the 2007–08 season, which led to their promotion to the Albanian First Division, the second tier. They were promoted to the Albanian Superliga for the first time at the end of the 2008–09 season, after beating Bylis Ballsh 5–2 in the playoff.

The club achieved worldwide recognition in 2010 when they organised a friendly for the Taçi Oil Cup with Spanish giants Real Madrid in Tiranë. The game ended in a 2–1 win for Real Madrid despite there being a lengthy two-hour power outage at half time at the Qemal Stafa Stadium. Gramozi were relegated from Albania's top level at the end of the 2009/10 season, after finishing bottom and 16 points from safety with former international player Agim Canaj at the helm.

Honours
 Kategoria e Dytë:
 Winners (1): 2007–08

Current squad

 (Captain)

References

External links
GRAMOZI
Sofra Kolonjare 
Erseka
KsGramozi Website

Gramozi Erseke
1927 establishments in Albania
Kolonjë, Korçë
Association football clubs established in 1927
Kategoria e Dytë clubs